Virac may refer to:

 Virac, Catanduanes, a municipality in the province of Catanduanes, Philippines
 Virac Airport, airport in Virac, Catanduanes
 Virac, Itogon, a barangay of the municipality of Itogon in the province of Benguet, Philippines
 Virac, Tarn, a municipality in the Tarn department, France
 Ventspils Starptautiskais Radioastronomijas Centrs (Ventspils International Radio Astronomy Centre), an ex-Soviet radio astronomy installation 30 km north of Ventspils, Latvia
 Virac, a trade name for the drug undecoylium chloride iodine